Chinese Chemical Society may refer to:
Chinese Chemical Society (Taipei), a major Taiwanese scholarly organization dedicated to chemistry
Chinese Chemical Society (Beijing), a major Chinese scholarly organization dedicated to chemistry
Chinese-American Chemical Society, an organization of Chinese chemists and chemical engineers